Typhlogarra widdowsoni or Garra widdowsoni, the Iraq blind barb or Haditha cave garra, is a species of cyprinid fish endemic to underground water systems near Haditha in Iraq. Although traditionally placed in its own genus Typhlogarra, this is not supported by genetic evidence, leading to its move to Garra. This cavefish is considered critically endangered because of water extraction, which has lowered the groundwater level. Once abundant, a survey in 2012 found that it now was very rare. Another species from the same place, Caecocypris basimi, may already be extinct. The only other known cavefish in Iraq is Eidinemacheilus proudlovei.

References

Cave fish
Cyprinid fish of Asia
Fish described in 1955
Labeoninae
Taxonomy articles created by Polbot
Taxobox binomials not recognized by IUCN